Varanasi North is a constituency of the Uttar Pradesh Legislative Assembly covering the city of Varanasi North in the Varanasi district of Uttar Pradesh, India.

Varanasi North is one of five assembly constituencies in the Varanasi Lok Sabha constituency. Since 2008, this assembly constituency has been numbered 388 amongst 403 constituencies.

Members of Legislative Assembly

Election results

2022

2017
Bharatiya Janta Party candidate Ravindra Jaiswal won in 2017 Uttar Pradesh Legislative Elections defeating Indian National Congress candidate Abdul Samad Ansari by a margin of 45,502 votes.

2012

2007

References

External links
 

Assembly constituencies of Uttar Pradesh
Varanasi
Politics of Varanasi district